Threipmuir Reservoir is a reservoir in the City of Edinburgh Council area, Scotland, UK. It is situated to the south of Edinburgh at the base of the Pentland Hills, two miles south of Balerno.

Threipmuir reservoir is located behind an earth dam, constructed to a design by Scottish civil engineer James Jardine. The reservoir was formed between 1843 and 1848 as a compensation reservoir for the Water of Leith by the Edinburgh Water Company.

The reservoir spillway discharges at the eastern end, from where the discharge flows into Harlaw Reservoir.

Bavelaw Castle lies on its south side.

See also
List of reservoirs and dams in the United Kingdom
Harlaw Reservoir
Harperrig Reservoir

External links
  
Scottish Government: Water of Leith Flood Prevention Scheme

Reservoirs in Edinburgh
LThreipmuir